Slieve Snaght is a mountain in the middle of the Inishowen peninsula of County Donegal, Ireland. It should not be confused with the mountain of the same name in the nearby Derryveagh range. It includes the lesser summits of Slieve Main, Crocknamaddy and Damph.

Naming

The mountain is said to be so named because snow lies on its summit until late May. In Cath Maige Tuired ("The Battle of Moytura"), a tale from Irish mythology, Slieve Snaght is called one of the "twelve chief mountains" of Ireland. There is a tradition of pilgrimage to the top of Slieve Snaght at Lughnasa, and a holy well near the summit, called Tobar na Súl ("well of the eyes"), is said to cure blindness.

History

In 1825, the summit was one of those used as a base for mapping Ireland as part of the Ordnance Survey's Principal Triangulation. The surveyors, which included Thomas Drummond, camped on the summit and built a wall to shield themselves from the weather.

See also
Lists of mountains in Ireland
Lists of mountains and hills in the British Isles
List of P600 mountains in the British Isles
List of Marilyns in the British Isles
List of Hewitt mountains in England, Wales and Ireland

References 

Mountains and hills of County Donegal
Marilyns of Ireland
Mountains under 1000 metres